This list consists of the bishops in the Episcopal Church in the United States of America, an independent province of the Anglican Communion. This shows the historical succession of the episcopate within this church.

Key to chart
The number references the sequence of consecration. Two capital letters before their number identify bishops consecrated for missionary work outside of the United States. "Diocese" refers to the diocese for which the individual was ordained. Note, this does not mean it was the only diocese that bishop presided over. For example, the Diocese of Delaware was under the supervision of the Diocese of Pennsylvania under William White. "PB" refers to whether the bishop became a Presiding Bishop in the ECUSA and, if so, which number in the sequence.

Under consecrators, one finds numbers or letters referencing previous bishops on the list. If a series of letters is under "Consecrators", then the consecrators were bishops or archbishops from outside of the ECUSA:

BAK = Gilbert Baker, Bishop of Hong Kong and Macao
BAN = Chiu Ban It, Bishop of Singapore
BOY = Laish Boyd, Bishop of the Bahamas, Turks and Caicos
BRT = Tony Burton, Bishop of Saskatchewan
CAB = Daniel Pina Cabral, Bishop of Lebombo
CAS = William Cassels, Bishop of Western China
CAR = George Carey, Archbishop of Canterbury
COR = Nigel Cornwall, Bishop of Borneo
DAL = John Daly, Bishop in Korea
DAR = Frederick Darwent, Bishop of Aberdeen and Orkney
ELA = Riah El-Assal, Bishop of Jerusalem
FYF = Rollestone Fyffe, Bishop of Rangoon
GOM = Ricardo Gomez Osnaya, Bishop of Western Mexico
HAL = Ronald Hall, Bishop of Victoria, Hong Kong (1932–1951) & Bishop of Hong Kong and Macao (1951–1966)
HIL = Fred Hiltz, Primate of the Anglican Church of Canada (2007-2019)
HIN = John Hinchliffe, Bishop of Peterborough (1769–1794)
HOL = John Holder, Archbishop of the West Indies (2009-2018)
ISO = Andrew Haruhisa Iso, Bishop of Osaka
KER = Greg Kerr-Wilson, Archbishop of Calgary and Metropolitan of Rupert's Land
KIL = Robert Kilgour, Primus and Bishop of Aberdeen
LEA = Arthur Lea, Bishop of Kyushu
LYO = Frank Lyons, Bishop of Bolivia
MAR = William Markham, Archbishop of York
MAT = Carlos Matsinhe, Bishop of Lebombo
MIL = Harold Miller, Bishop of Down and Dromore
MMS = Melissa M. Skelton, IX Bishop of New Westminster
MOL = Herbert Molony, Bishop of Chekiang
MOO = John Moore, Archbishop of Canterbury
MOS = Charles Moss, Bishop of Bath and Wells
MOU = George Moule, Bishop of Mid-China
NOR = Frank Norris, Bishop of North China
PET = Arthur Petrie, Bishop of Moray and Ross
POR = Beilby Porteus, Bishop of London
ROB = Basil Roberts, Bishop of Singapore
ROW = Francis Rowinski, Polish National Catholic bishop
SCO = Charles Scott, Bishop of North China
SHE = Victor George Shearburn, Bishop of Rangoon
SHO = David Shoji Tani, Bishop of Okinawa
SKI = John Skinner, bishop coadjutor of Aberdeen
STE = Krister Stendahl, Bishop of Stockholm
THO = John Thomas, Bishop of Rochester
TSE = Lindel Tsen, Bishop of Honan
UEM = Nathaniel Makoto Uematsu, Primate of The Nippon Sei Ko Kai and Bishop of Hokkaido
VER = Joris Vercammen, Archbishop of Utrecht
WIL = Cornelius Wilson, Bishop of Costa Rica
ZIE = Thaddeus F. Zielinski, Polish National Catholic bishop

Chart of bishop succession

The Roman numeral before the diocese name represents where in the sequence that bishop falls; e.g., the fourth bishop of Pennsylvania is written "IV Pennsylvania".  Where a diocese is in bold type it indicates that the bishop is a current bishop of that diocese.

1–100

101–200

201–300

301–400

401–500

501–600

601–700

701–800

801–900

901–1000

1001–1100

1101–1200

Bishops elect

See also
Anglican Communion
Apostolic succession
Historical episcopate
List of original dioceses of the ECUSA
List of presiding bishops of the Episcopal Church in the United States of America

Notes

Citations

References

Sources

 
 

 
Anglicanism-related lists
Lists of Anglican bishops and archbishops